The Hotel Vancouver, the second of three by that name, was a 15 story (77m) Italian Renaissance style hotel built in 1916 by the Canadian Pacific Railway (CPR). The architect was Francis S. Swales.

The hotel closed in 1939, when an arrangement was made with rival Canadian National Railway (CNR) to jointly operate CNR's new hotel, located two blocks away. That hotel, which took over the name Hotel Vancouver, is still operating today. The 1916 CPR building survived until 1949 when it was demolished by the Eaton's department store chain.

Famous Guests
Many famous people stayed at this hotel, including Winston Churchill, Sarah Bernhardt, Babe Ruth, Ethel Barrymore, and Anna Pavlova. It was also much loved by the people of Vancouver, who made its rooftop dining room and dance floor, the Panorama Roof, a favourite place for a night out.

Structure and Location
The upstart Canadian Northern wanted to impress the town to further its rivalry with the Canadian Pacific. To this end, the east side of False Creek was filled in to expand rail yards and situate a Beaux Arts railway station. Once flanked by a much more elaborate Great Northern station, since demolished, the Pacific Central Station still stands today. In an agreement with the city, the Canadian Northern promised to build a new hotel. However, the First World War and the insolvency of the Canadian Northern Railway delayed the start of the project; the successor Canadian National began construction in 1928. The Great Depression delayed the opening of the third Hotel Vancouver until 1939. Money to complete the hotel was finally provided by the Canadian government in 1937 as an unemployment relief projet in the dark days of the Depression. Fearing the market was not large enough for competing hotels, the railways agreed to a joint CP-CN hotel as a condition of the completion.

World War II
During the Second World War, the second Hotel Vancouver was used as a barracks. The building was boarded up and placed under guard at the end of the war, a time when returning veterans were having difficulty finding housing. In January 1946 thirty-five veterans, unimpeded by Army sentries, took over the vacant hotel and announced the building was now veterans housing. They organized themselves and soon were housing approximately 1,000 veterans and some spouses.

The building was used by the veterans until 1948 and torn down a year later. The block became a parking lot until 1969.  The Pacific Centre, including the TD Tower and the main Vancouver Eaton's Store (now Nordstrom), was constructed between 1969 and 1973 and stands on the site today.

Media depictions
The hotel was recreated in virtual form in the 2014 interactive work Circa 1948.

References

External links
Emporis Listing
 
 BC Archives Photo: Billiard Room, Second Hotel Vancouver, 1920s 
 BC Archives Photo: Dining Room, Second Hotel Vancouver, 1920s
BC Archives Photo: Interior, Second Hotel Vancouver, 1916
Floor plans from 1916 magazine article

Canadian National Railway hotels
Hotels in Vancouver
Former skyscrapers
Tourism in Vancouver
Hotel buildings completed in 1916
Defunct hotels in Canada
Canadian Pacific Railway hotels
Italianate architecture in Canada
Demolished buildings and structures in British Columbia
Demolished hotels
Buildings and structures demolished in 1949